Kamešnica is a mountain in the Dinarides, located in the southern end of the Dinara Mountain Range on the border between Bosnia and Herzegovina (Canton 10) and Croatia (Dalmatia). The tallest peak is Konj (Horse) , which is located in Bosnia and Herzegovina and offer views of both sides of the border. In clear weather, it is possible to see the most remote areas of the Adriatic Sea and its islands. The vicinity's many trails and caves make it popular with hikers.

Ecosystem 

Kamešnica is a favorable habitat for many species of plants and animals. The ecosystem of the northern parts of the mountain has been completely preserved due to its isolated location and the thick forest that surrounds it.

Climate

Most of Kamešnica's peaks are covered by snow for six to seven months of the year.

Most of Kamešnica has a climate characterized by its position in two main climate regions; continental (northern side which is surrounded by Livanjsko field, 700 m above sea-level with mean annual temperature of 9 °C) and submediterranean (southern side which is surrounded by Sinjsko field, 300 m above sea-level where the mean annual temperature is 12.5 °C). Only the highest parts of Kamešnica (above 1300 m), have a snowy-forested climate.

The weather and the mean annual air temperature can be compared using data of Zavizan metro station (1594 m). The lowest temperature on Kamešnica during the winter approximately measures -20 °C. Mean annual quantity of precipitation on Kamešnica ranges from 1200 mm to 2500 mm (maximum quantity on the peaks Konj, Kurljaj, Burnjaca and Gareta). In general, the climate of Kamešnica is very similar to the climate of Velebit.

The "Bura" is a dry and cold wind that blows from the northeast (from continent towards sea). While the bura is blowing, the peaks of Kamešnica are in the cloud called "Cap".

In February 2021, the mountain was declared as 12th of Croatia's Nature Park.

See also 
 List of mountains in Croatia
 List of mountains in Bosnia and Herzegovina
 Sinj
 Livno
 Dinaric Alps
 Massacre of villages under Kamešnica

References

External links
 Commission to Preserve National Monuments of Bosnia and Herzegovina

Mountains of Bosnia and Herzegovina
Mountains of the Federation of Bosnia and Herzegovina
Mountains of Croatia
Bosnia and Herzegovina–Croatia border
International mountains of Europe

als:Konj
de:Kamešnica